

Origins and variants
The surname Barton has multiple possible origins. It may denote origin from one of the many places called Barton in France; however, another proposal would derive the name from Dunbarton in Northern France. The cities of Paris and Lourdes have the highest number of Barton families in the world

The surname name is also common in Germany, Poland, and other countries in the Slavic cultural sphere. In the vast majority of cases, it is also a short form of the name Bartholomew, originally a name borne by one of the apostles which became a popular forename in Europe in the Middle Ages. 

In Western France, the name may derive from the commune of Barenton.

People

Arts and entertainment
 Anne Barton (actress) (1924–2000), American actress
 Bernard Barton (1784–1849), English Quaker poet
 Bethany Barton, American author and illustrator of children's books
 Charles Barton (director) (1902–1981), American actor and director
 Chris Barton (actor) (born 1987), English actor and singer
 Edward Barton (born 1958), English poet, artist and songwriter
 Eileen Barton (1924–2006), American singer
 Emily Barton (born 1969), American novelist
 Fred Barton (composer) (born 1958), American composer and lyricist
 Harry Barton (architect) (1876–1937), American architect
 James Barton (vaudeville) (1890–1962), American vaudevillian and character actor
 Jamie Barton (born 1981), American opera singer
 John Barton (director) (1928–2018), English theatre director and founding member of the Royal Shakespeare Company
 John Barton (writer), 15th-century English writer on Lollardy
 John Barton (poet) (born 1957), Canadian poet
 Margaret Barton (born 1926), British actress
 Marmaduke Barton (1865–1938), English pianist
 Mischa Barton (born 1986), UK-born American actress and fashion model  
 Peter Barton (actor) (born 1956), American actor
 Polly Barton, American textile artist
 Ralph Barton (1891–1931), American artist
 Rick Barton (musician), American guitarist (Dropkick Murphys, Everybody Out!)
 Robert Barton (actor) (born 1970), British actor
 Roger Barton (film editor), American film editor
 Roxy Barton (1879-1962), Australian-born actress   
 Stephen Barton (born 1982), British film and video game composer
 William Barton (writer) (born 1950), U.S. science fiction writer
 William Barton (hymnologist) (1598–1678), English hymnologist
 William Barton (heraldist) (1754–1817), designer of the Great Seal of the United States
 William Barton (musician) (born 1981), Australian Didgeridoo player

Science, technology, and medicine
 Alberto Barton (1870-1950), Peruvian microbiologist
 Benjamin Smith Barton (1766–1815), American botanist, naturalist, and physician
 Clara Barton (1821–1912), founder of the American Red Cross
 David K. Barton (born 1927), American radar engineer
 Derek Barton (1918–1998), chemist
 Ethel Sarel Barton (1864–1922), English phycologist better known as Ethel Sarel Gepp
 George Hunt Barton (1852–1933), American geologist, arctic explorer, and college professor
 Jacqueline Barton (born 1952), American chemist
 John Barton (engineer) (1771–1834), engineer noted for his engravings using his Ruling Engine
 John Rhea Barton (1794–1871), American orthopedic surgeon
 Lela Viola Barton (1901–1967), American botanist who specialized in seed germination and storage
 Michael Barton, American ichthyologist
 Otis Barton (1899–1992), American deep-sea diver
 Robert S. Barton (1925–2009), computer scientist, chief architect of several computers made by Burroughs Corporation
 Thomas J. Barton (born 1940), American chemist
 William P. C. Barton (1786–1856), American physician

Academics
 Anne Barton (1933–2013), American-born British scholar and Shakespearean critic
 Andrew Barton, lecturer in the School of Communication at the University of Miami
 Arthur W. Barton (1899–1976), headmaster and academic author
 Cornelius J. Barton (born 1936), American engineer, businessman; Acting President of Rensselaer Polytechnic Institute (1998–99) 
 H. Arnold Barton (1920–2016), American historian
 John Barton (1789–1852), British economist
 Peter Barton (born 1955), British military historian 
 Reid W. Barton (born 1984), four-time gold medal winner at the International Mathematical Olympiad

Military
 Charles Barton (1760–1819), an Anglo-Irish British Army officer 
 Geoffrey Barton (1844–1922), British major general
 John Kennedy Barton (1853–1921), United States Navy rear admiral

 Matthew Barton (Royal Navy officer) (c. 1715–1795), English naval officer
 Raymond O. Barton (1890–1963), United States Army general in World War II
 Robert Barton of Over Barnton, (died 1540) Scottish sailor and courtier
 Seth Barton (1829–1900), Confederate general
 Thomas Barton (Medal of Honor) (1831–?), American Medal of Honor recipient
 William Barton (1748–1831), American Revolutionary War soldier, known for capturing an enemy general

Politics, government and law
 Sir Andrew Barton (c. 1466–1511), Lord High Admiral of the Kingdom of Scotland
 Andrew William Barton (1862–1957), British Member of Parliament for Oldham, 1910–1922
 Basil Barton (1879–1958), British solicitor and Conservative Member of Parliament (MP)
 Ben Barton (1823–1899), American politician, physician, businessman
 Bruce Fairchild Barton (1886–1967), advertising executive and U.S. Congressman
 Charles Barton (New South Wales politician) (1848–1912), one of the Members of the New South Wales Legislative Assembly, 1907–1910
 Charles Barton (1768–1843), English legal writer
 Charles Barton (Queensland politician) (1829–1902), member of the Queensland Legislative Assembly
 Charles Barton (New Zealand politician) (1852–1935), New Zealand farmer, businessman and mayor
 David Barton (1783–1837), U.S. Senator from Missouri
 Edmund Barton (1849–1920), Australian politician and first Australian Prime Minister
 Edward Barton (c.1533-1598), English Ambassador to the Ottoman Empire
 Fred Barton (1917–1963), British socialist politician
 George Burnett Barton (1836–1912), Australian lawyer
 George Elliott Barton (1827–1906), New Zealand politician
 Henry Barton, appointed Sheriff of London in 1406 and elected Lord Mayor of London in 1416
 Hiram Barton (1810–1880), American politician
 Hiram Merritt Barton (1856–1928), American politician
 James R. Barton (c. 1810-1857), early Sheriff of Los Angeles County
 Joe Barton (born 1949), Texas politician
 John J. Barton (1906–2004), Mayor of Indianapolis
 John Barton (1614–1684), English politician who sat in the House of Commons in 1659 and 1660
 John Saxon Barton (1875–1961), New Zealand accountant, writer, lawyer, and magistrate
 Joshua Barton (1792 – 1823). American politician
 Philip Barton (born 1963), British diplomat
 Richard W. Barton (1800–1859), Virginia politician and lawyer
 Rick Barton, United States Representative to the Economic and Social Council of the United Nations
 Robert Barton, (1881–1975), Irish nationalist and diplomat
 Robert E. "Bob" Barton (born 1948), former member of the Louisiana House of Representatives
 Robert T. Barton (1842–1917), American lawyer, politician and writer
 Roger Barton (born 1945), British engineer and politician
 Samuel Barton (1785–1858), U.S. Representative from New York
 Tom Barton (born 1949), Australian politician
 Verity Barton (born 1985), Australian (Queensland) politician
 William Edward Barton (1868–1955), U.S. Representative from Missouri
 William Hickson Barton (1917–2013), Canadian diplomat
 William T. Barton, (born 1933), American politician
 Sir William Barton (1862–1957), British Liberal politician

Sports
 Adam Barton (born 1991), English footballer
 Arthur Barton (cricketer) (1874–1949), English cricketer
 Bob Barton (1941–2018), American professional baseball player
 Brian Barton (born 1982), American professional baseball player
 Charles Barton (cricketer) (1860–1919), English cricketer
 Chris Barton (ice hockey) (born 1987), Canadian ice hockey player
 Chris Barton (cyclist) (born 1988), American cyclist
 Christopher Barton (1927–2013), British rower who competed in the 1948 Summer Olympics
 Cody Barton (born 1996), American football player
 Dick Barton (boxer) (1911–1990), South African boxer
 Eddie Barton, New Zealand footballer
 Eric Barton (born 1977), American football player
 Frederick Barton (pentathlete) (1900–1993), British pentathlete
 George Barton (sport shooter), Australian sport shooter
 Harold Barton (1910–1969), English footballer
 Harold Barton (cricketer) (1882–1970), English cricketer
 Harris Barton (born 1964), American football player
 Harry Barton (baseball) (1875–1955), American baseball player
 Jackson Barton (born 1995), American football player
 Jim Barton (American football) (1934–2013), American football player
 Jim Barton (sailor) (born 1956), American Olympic sailor
 Joe Barton (soccer) (born 1981), American soccer player
 Joey Barton (born 1982), English footballer
 John Barton (rugby league), English rugby league footballer of the 1950s and 1960s
 John Barton (footballer, born 1866) (1866–1910), English international football player
 John Barton (footballer, born 1953), English football player
 Joseph Barton (cricketer) (1860–1945), English cricketer
 Kirk Barton (born 1984), retired American football player
 Matthew Barton (tennis) (born 1991), Australian tennis player
 Michael Barton (cricketer) (1914–2006), English cricketer
 Paul Barton (born 1935), New Zealand cricketer
 Peter Barton (rugby league), rugby league footballer of the 1960s
 Roger Barton (footballer) (1946–2013), English footballer
 Roger Barton (rugby union) (1876–1949), rugby union player who represented Australia
 Teddy Barton (1904–1941), English footballer
 Tom Barton (rugby league) (1883-1958), English professional rugby league footballer
 Tony Barton (footballer) (1937–1993), English footballer and football manager
 Tony Barton (athlete) (born 1969), American high jumper
 Warren Barton (born 1969), English former football player
 Will Barton (born 1991), American basketball player
 William Barton (cricketer, born 1777) (1777–1825), English cricketer
 William Barton (cricketer, born 1858) (1858–1942), New Zealand cricketer

Religion
 Arthur Barton (bishop) (1881–1962), Irish Anglican bishop
 David Barton (author), American evangelical minister, author and political activist
 Elizabeth Barton (c. 1506–1534), English prophetess
 George Aaron Barton (1859–1942), Canadian author and clergyman
 Harry Barton (priest) (1898–1968), Archdeacon of Sudbury
 James L. Barton (1835-1936) Chairman of Near East Relief
 John Barton (missionary) (1836–1908), English Anglican priest
 John Barton (Quaker) (1755–1789), English Quaker and abolitionist  
 John Barton (theologian) (born 1948), English theologian and professor
 Lane W. Barton (1899 – 1997), American bishop
 Richard Bradshaigh (1601–1669), Jesuit priest, known as Richard Barton 
 Thomas Barton (divine) (1730–1780), Irish divine
 Thomas Barton (Royalist) (died 1681/2), Royalist divine
 William Barton (priest), Archdeacon of Totnes, 1385–1407

Other
Margo Barton, New Zealand fashion designer and milliner 
Mark Orrin Barton (1955–1999), perpetrator of the 1999 Atlanta day trading firm shootings
Rich Barton (born 1967), former Microsoft executive and Expedia founder
Richard Barton (1790–1866), colonist and settler of New Zealand

Fictional characters
 Ashley Barton, alter ego of Marvel Comics supervillain Spider-Bitch
 Dick Barton, fictional detective
 Clint Barton, alter ego of Marvel Comics superhero Hawkeye
 Charlie Barton, fictional character in The Howling (film)
 Holly Barton, a fictional character from the British soap opera Emmerdale
 James Barton (Emmerdale), a fictional character from the British soap opera Emmerdale
 John Barton (Emmerdale), a fictional character in British soap Emmerdale
 John Barton, a fictional character in Elizabeth Gaskell's novel Mary Barton
 John Barton, a fictional character in Looking for Alibrandi

See also
 Bartoň, Czech surname
 Edward Barton-Wright (1860–1951), British entrepreneur
 John de Barton, 14th century judge
 Mike Polchlopek (born 1963), American wrestler with the ring name Mike Barton

References

Czech-language surnames
English-language surnames
Polish-language surnames
German-language surnames
French-language surnames
Patronymic surnames
Toponymic surnames